The men's 3000 metres steeplechase at the 2015 Asian Athletics Championships was held on June 6.

Results

References

3000
Steeplechase at the Asian Athletics Championships